Events from the year 1954 in Jordan.

Incumbents
Monarch: Hussein 
Prime Minister: Fawzi al-Mulki (until 4 May), Tawfik Abu al-Huda (starting 4 May)

Events

 1954 Jordanian general election.

See also

 Years in Iraq
 Years in Syria
 Years in Saudi Arabia

References

 
1950s in Jordan
Jordan
Jordan
Years of the 20th century in Jordan